The Commission of Anarchist Relations (CRA) is a Venezuelan anarchist organization that has been publishing the periodical El Libertario since 1995. The CRA views itself as involved in a "tri-polar struggle" against both leftist President Hugo Chávez and Venezuela's US-backed opposition.

In 2004, the CRA announced the opening of the Libertarian Social Studies Center in Caracas, making available thousands of books and magazines on social sciences, sex, social ecology, anarchism, alternative culture, globalization, and human rights.

External links
 El Libertario official webpage
 Of Chavistas and Anarquistas: Brief Sketch of a Visit to Venezuela

Anarchist organizations in Venezuela
International Workers' Association